is a kind of wagashi (a Japanese traditional confectionery) originally developed in Japan based on the "Nanban confectionery" (confectionery imported from abroad to Japan during the Azuchi–Momoyama period). The batter is poured into large square or rectangular molds, baked in an oven and cut into long rectangular shapes. Since the recipe calls for mizuame, a type of sugar syrup, Castella has a moist texture.

Now a specialty of Nagasaki, the cake was brought to Japan by Portuguese merchants in the 16th century. The name is derived from Portuguese , meaning "cake from Castile". It is somewhat similar to Madeira cake, also associated with Portugal, but its closest relative is pão-de-ló, also a Portuguese cake.

A similar cake, called taisan (meaning sharpening stone in Kapampangan), is a traditional dessert in Pampanga province in the Philippines.

History

In the 16th century, the Portuguese reached Japan and soon started trade and missionary work. Nagasaki was then the only Japanese port open for foreign commerce. The Portuguese introduced many then-unusual things, such as guns, tobacco, and pumpkins. The cake could be stored for a long time, and so was useful for the sailors who were out on the sea for months. In the Edo period, in part due to the cost of sugar, castella was an expensive dessert to make despite the ingredients sold by the Portuguese. When the Emperor of Japan's envoy was invited, the Tokugawa shogunate presented the Castella. Over the years, the taste changed to suit Japanese palates.

Varieties
There are now many varieties made with ingredients such as powdered green tea, brown sugar, and honey. They may be molded in various shapes; a popular Japanese festival food is baby castella, a bite-sized version.

Siberia, castella cake filled with youkan (sweet bean jelly), was popular in the Meiji era; it had a resurgence since it appeared in the  2013 animated film The Wind Rises, by Hayao Miyazaki.

Castella mix is used for the pancakes that are sandwiched together with sweet adzuki bean paste in the confection known as dorayaki.

Main manufacturers 
Founded in 1624 : Castella Honke Fukusaya ( Nagasaki City, Nagasaki Prefecture )

1681 Founded: Shooken( Nagasaki City, Nagasaki Prefecture)

Founded in 1900 ( Meiji 33): Bunmeido(Nagasaki City, Nagasaki Prefecture) Known for the phrase "castella first, telephone number second" and in the Kanto region , commercials of bear puppets dancing can-can dances.

Taiwanese castella
Castella were first introduced to Taiwan during the age of Taiwan under Japanese rule. In 1968, Ye Yongqing, the owner of a Japanese bakery in Taipei named Nanbanto, partnered with the Japanese company Nagasaki Honpu to establish a castella business. 

Taiwanese style castella is generally more soufflé-like than the Japanese variety with a custard like center. A speciality of Tamsui is a simple pillow shaped castella cake. Taiwanese style castella has been introduced into Japan.

See also
Gairaigo
Japanese words of Portuguese origin

References

External links

Cakes
Japanese desserts and sweets
Japanese fusion cuisine
Portuguese fusion cuisine